Whitchurch Hill is a village in the Chiltern Hills in Oxfordshire, about  northwest of Reading, Berkshire, near Whitchurch-on-Thames. The Church of England parish church of Saint John the Baptist was designed by the architect Francis Bacon (1842–1930) and built in 1883. Whitchuch Hill has a public house, the Sun Inn.

References

Sources

Villages in Oxfordshire